King Haakon VII's Medal of Liberty was established on 18 May 1945. The medal is awarded to Norwegian or foreign military or civilian personnel for significant service to Norway during World War II. This service need not have been in direct contact with the enemy.

Description of the Medal

 The medal is bronze, circular and suspended from the ribbon by a stylised bronze ribbon folded at both ends.
 The obverse bears the monogram of King Haakon VII over a letter V symbolising victory. This is surrounded by a circle of beads, outside of which is written ALT FOR NORGE 1940-1945 (ALL FOR NORWAY 1940-1945)
 The reverse is plain apart from a wreath of oak leaves, tied with a ribbon at the base.
 The ribbon is plain dark blue. When ribbons only are worn, the ribbon bears the King's monogram in bronze.

See also
 King Haakon VIIs Freedom Cross
 Orders, decorations, and medals of Norway

References

 
Awards established in 1945
1945 establishments in Norway
Military awards and decorations of Norway